Beaufortia micrantha, commonly known as small-leaved beaufortia or little bottlebrush, is a species of flowering plant in the myrtle family, Myrtaceae and is endemic to the southwest of Western Australia. It is a compact shrub with tiny leaves pressed against the stems and profuse heads of purple or pinkish-coloured flowers.

Description
The leaves of Beaufortia empetrifolia are similar in size and shape but are not pressed against the stems to the same extent.

The flowers have 5 sepals, 5 petals and 5 bundles of stamens.

Taxonomy and naming
Beaufortia micrantha was first formally described in 1843 by Johannes Conrad Schauer in Dissertatio phytographica de Regelia, Beaufortia et Calothamno. The specific epithet (micrantha) is derived from the Ancient Greek μικρός (mikrós) meaning "small" and ἄνθος (ánthos) meaning "flower".

Distribution and habitat
Beaufortia micrantha mainly occurs in and between the Esperance, Albany, Corrigin and Southern Cross districts in the Avon Wheatbelt, Coolgardie, Esperance Plains, Jarrah Forest and Mallee bioregions of south-western Western Australia. It usually grows in sandy soils derived from laterite on plains and ridges.

Conservation
Beaufortia micrantha is classified as "not threatened" by the Western Australian Government Department of Biodiversity, Conservation and Attractions.

References

micrantha
Plants described in 1843
Endemic flora of Western Australia
Taxa named by Johannes Conrad Schauer